Aleksei Ilyin may refer to:
 Aleksei Viktorovich Ilyin (b. 1958), Soviet Russian football player and coach
 Aleksei Vladimirovich Ilyin (b. 1978), Russian football player